A viscous coupling is a mechanical device which transfers torque and rotation by the medium of a viscous fluid.

Design
Rotary viscous couplings with interleaved, perforated plates and filled with viscous fluids are used in automotive systems to transmit torque. The device consists of a number of circular plates with tabs or perforations, fitted very close to each other in a sealed drum. Alternate plates are connected to a driving shaft at one end of the assembly and a driven shaft at the other end. The drum is filled with a dilatant fluid, often silicone-based, to about 80% by volume. When the two sets of plates are rotating in unison, the fluid stays cool and remains liquid. When the plates start rotating at different speeds, the shear effect of the tabs or perforations on the fluid will cause it to heat and become nearly solid because the viscosity of dilatant fluids rapidly increases with shear. The fluid in this state will effectively glue the plates together and transmit power from one set of plates to the other. The size of the tabs or perforations, the number of plates, and the fluid used will determine the strength and onset of this mechanical transfer.

This type of device essentially differs from fluid couplings such as torque converters by using the viscosity of the medium to transfer torque, rather than its momentum. This makes it potentially useful even on very small scales and requires less cooling. The torque transmitted is sensitive to the difference in speeds of the input and output but is almost independent of their common rate.

Vehicles
Viscous couplings are used as the center differential in some four-wheel-drive (4WD) vehicles.

The first mass-produced viscous couplings for a permanent 4WD off-road-capable vehicle was in the AMC Eagle, which was produced from 1980 to 1988 model years. The AMC Eagle's single-speed model 119 New Process central differential used a viscous coupling filled with a liquid silicone-based material. It linked the front and rear differentials for quiet and smooth transfer of power to the axle with the greatest traction, on wet or dry pavement.

Viscous couplings are used as the center differential in cars such as the Toyota Celica GT-Four, and also as a limited slip differential (LSD) in rear axles. They offer a cheaper way to implement four-wheel-drive than technologies like the mechanical-transfer Torsen differentials.

Volvo, Subaru, Land Rover, Vauxhall/Opel, and many others have also used viscous couplings in their drivelines at various times. They are now mostly superseded by electronically controlled devices.

Attributions  
Tony Rolt is often credited with the original idea and development as applied to automatic couplings in vehicle transmission systems, particularly four-wheel drive, working with Freddie Dixon at the time. Ferguson Research and FF Developments were companies formed in the 1970s to commercialize much early work into 4WD systems and devices. 

It is thought that GKN Driveline owns any remaining worldwide patents today and offers several variants and combinations of viscous couplings integrated with other driveline components.

See also 
 Hele-Shaw clutch
 Limited slip differential

References

External links 
 Interactive animation
 The Viscous Coupling: how to test & replace it
 Different types of 4WD
 Some torque~temp VC calibration curves

Mechanical devices using viscosity
Vehicle parts
Clutches